Almost a Woman is a 2001 made-for-television film, directed by Betty Kaplan and based on the autobiographical book of the same name by Puerto Rican writer Esmeralda Santiago. The film is about a young woman named Esmeralda and her family who move to New York from a rural area of Puerto Rico. The transition is difficult due to the many challenges she and her family face. It was aired on PBS as part of Masterpiece Theatre's American Collection.

External links
 

Films set in 1961
American television films
2001 television films
2001 films
Peabody Award-winning broadcasts
Films directed by Betty Kaplan
Films scored by Lee Holdridge